In logic, general frames (or simply frames) are Kripke frames with an additional structure, which are used to model modal and intermediate logics. The general frame semantics combines the main virtues of Kripke semantics and algebraic semantics: it shares the transparent geometrical insight of the former, and robust completeness of the latter.

Definition
the Boolean operations of (binary) intersection, union, and complement,
They are thus a special case of fields of sets with additional structure.
 for every propositional variable .

In this case we call  an -frame.

Types of frames
In full generality, general frames are hardly more than a fancy name for Kripke models; in particular, the correspondence of modal axioms to properties on the accessibility relation is lost. This can be remedied by imposing additional conditions on the set of admissible valuations.

A frame  is called
differentiated, if  implies ,
tight, if  implies ,
atomic, if  contains all singletons,
refined, if it is differentiated and tight,
descriptive, if it is refined and compact.
Kripke frames are refined and atomic. However, infinite Kripke frames are never compact. Every finite differentiated or atomic frame is a Kripke frame.

Descriptive frames are the most important class of frames because of the duality theory (see below). Refined frames are useful as a common generalization of descriptive and Kripke frames.

Operations and morphisms on frames
Every Kripke model  induces the general frame , where  is defined as

The fundamental truth-preserving operations of generated subframes, p-morphic images, and disjoint unions of Kripke frames have analogues on general frames. A frame  is a generated subframe of a frame , if the Kripke frame  is a generated subframe of the Kripke frame  (i.e.,  is a subset of  closed upwards under , and ), and

 for every .

The refinement of a frame  is a refined frame  defined as follows. We consider the equivalence relation

Then we put

Completeness
Unlike Kripke frames, every normal modal logic  is complete with respect to a class of general frames. Moreover, every logic  is complete with respect to a single descriptive frame. Indeed,  is complete with respect to its canonical model, and the general frame induced by the canonical model (called the canonical frame of ) is descriptive.

Jónsson–Tarski duality

General frames bear close connection to modal algebras. Let  be a general frame. The set  is closed under Boolean operations, therefore it is a subalgebra of the power set Boolean algebra . It also carries an additional unary operation, .

In the opposite direction, it is possible to construct the dual frame  to any modal algebra .

A frame and its dual validate the same formulas, hence the general frame semantics and algebraic semantics are in a sense equivalent. The double dual  of any modal algebra is isomorphic to  itself. This is not true in general for double duals of frames, as the dual of every algebra is descriptive. In fact, a frame  is descriptive if and only if it is isomorphic to its double dual .

It is also possible to define duals of p-morphisms on one hand, and modal algebra homomorphisms on the other hand. In this way the operators  and  become a pair of contravariant functors between the category of general frames, and the category of modal algebras. These functors provide a duality (called Jónsson–Tarski duality after Bjarni Jónsson and Alfred Tarski) between the categories of descriptive frames, and modal algebras. This is a special case of a more general duality between complex algebras and fields of sets on relational structures.

Intuitionistic frames
The frame semantics for intuitionistic and intermediate logics can be developed in parallel to the semantics for modal logics.
intersection and union,
the operation .
Validity and other concepts are then introduced similarly to modal frames, with a few changes necessary to accommodate for the weaker closure properties of the set of admissible valuations. In particular, an intuitionistic frame  is called
tight, if  implies ,
Tight intuitionistic frames are automatically differentiated, hence refined.

The dual of an intuitionistic frame  is the Heyting algebra .

where .

It is possible to construct intuitionistic general frames from transitive reflexive modal frames and vice versa, see modal companion.

References
Alexander Chagrov and Michael Zakharyaschev, Modal Logic, vol. 35 of Oxford Logic Guides, Oxford University Press, 1997.
Patrick Blackburn, Maarten de Rijke, and Yde Venema, Modal Logic, vol. 53 of Cambridge Tracts in Theoretical Computer Science, Cambridge University Press, 2001.

Modal logic
Model theory
Duality theories